Sir Robert Hermann Schomburgk (5 June 1804 – 11 March 1865) was a German-born explorer for Great Britain who carried out geographical, ethnological and botanical studies in South America and the West Indies, and also fulfilled diplomatic missions for the United Kingdom in the Dominican Republic and Thailand.

Life and career
Schomburgk was born at Freyburg, Prussian Saxony, the son of a Protestant minister. In 1820, whilst staying with his uncle, he learnt botany from a professor.

Commercial career
He entered commercial life and, in 1828, went to the United States, where he worked for a time as a clerk in Boston and Philadelphia.
In 1828, he was requested to supervise a transport of Saxon sheep to the American state of Virginia, where he lived for a time. In the same year, he became a partner in a tobacco factory at Richmond. The factory was burned down, and Schomburgk was ruined. He suffered further setbacks on the Caribbean island of St. Thomas, where he lost all his belongings in a fire. Consequently, he ceased his business activities.

Geographic and exploration career
In 1830, he left for Anegada, one of the Virgin Isles, notorious for its shipwrecks. Although he did not possess the special knowledge that is required for such work, he surveyed the island at his own expense and sent to the Royal Geographical Society (London) a report which created such an impression that, in 1835, he was entrusted by that body with conducting an expedition of exploration of British Guiana.

He fulfilled his mission (1835–1839) with great success, incidentally discovering the giant Victoria Regia water lily in 1837 and many new species of orchids, one genus of which, Schomburgkia, was named for him. He also laid to rest the persistent myth of Raleigh's Lake Parime by proposing that the seasonal flooding of the Rupununi savannah had been misidentified as a lake. In 1841, he returned to Guiana, this time as a British Government official to survey the colony and fix its eastern and western boundaries. The result was the provisional boundary between British Guiana and Venezuela, known as the "Schomburgk Line", and the boundary with the Dutch colony of Surinam.
He also made further geographical and ethnological observations and was joined there by his brother, Moritz Richard. He repeatedly urged fixing the boundary with Brazil, motivated by his encounters with Brazilian enslavement of local Indian tribes, most of which no longer exist. Schomburgk's survey later played a role in the arbitration of the southern boundary between British Guiana and Brazil, with arbitration by the King of Italy in 1904.

On the brothers' return to London in June 1844, Schomburgk presented a report of his journey to the Geographical Society, for which he was knighted by Queen Victoria in 1845, and continued in other official capacities. In 1846, he was stationed in Barbados, where he gathered information to compile a geographical and statistical description of the island, later to be published as the History of Barbados published in 1848 by Cass as a library series of West Indian studies.

Diplomatic career
In 1848, he was appointed British consul to the Dominican Republic. In 1850, he signed an advantageous commercial treaty for Great Britain and also secured a truce from Soulouque on behalf of the Dominican government. During the following years, he contributed valuable papers about the physical geography of the island to the journal of the Royal Geographical Society. In 1857, he was promoted to the position of British Consul-General of Siam, where Britain exercised extraterritorial jurisdiction through consular courts over British subjects. In a letter to his cousin William, Schomburgk notes, "In order to get an insight into the English summary police court proceedings, I was, before I left London, obliged to attend police courts there for some time, also to acquaint myself with these proceedings by the study of books. Based in Bangkok, he also continued his geographical surveys. The letter gives a short account of his visit to the semi-independent kingdom of Chiang Mai in 1859–60, and thence by elephant across the mountain range to Moulmein on the Bay of Bengal, returning to Bangkok after a trip of 135 days and approximately 1000 English miles.

Death
He retired from the public service in 1864, hampered by health problems, and died in Schöneberg on 11 March 1865.

Recognition 
Schomburgk was a member of various European, American, and Asiatic learned societies, and was a knight of the Legion of Honour and of the Prussian Order of the Red Eagle. 

Schomburgk's deer  (Rucervus schomburgki) was named after him. 

The South American fishes Mylesinus schomburgkii (Valenciennes, 1850), Polycentrus schomburgkii (Müller & Troschel, 1849) and Myloplus schomburgkii (Jardine, 1841) are named after him.

Many special of Neotropical plants are named for him:
Harperocallis schomburgkiana (Oliv.) L.M.Campb. & Dorr

His botanical collection is at Kew and his ethnographical collection from Guyana is at the British Museum.

Works
 Voyage in Guiana and upon the Shores of the Orinoco during the Years 1835–'39 (London, 1840; translated into German by his brother Otto, under the title Reisen in Guiana und am Orinoco in den Jahren 1835–'39, Leipsig, 1841, with a preface by Alexander von Humboldt)
 Researches in Guiana, 1837–'39 (1840)
 Description of British Guiana, Geographical and Statistical (London, 1840)
 Views in the Interior of Guiana (1840)
 Baubacenia Alexandrine et Alexandra imperatris (Brunswick, 1845), monograph on plants discovered in British Guiana
 Rapatea Frederici Augusti et Saxo-Frederici regalis (1845), monograph on plants discovered in British Guiana
 History of Barbadoes (London, 1847)
 The Discovery of the Empire of Guiana by Sir Walter Raleigh (1848)
 Peter Rivière (ed.), The Guiana Travels of Robert Schomburgk 1835–1844, 2 vols (Aldershot: Ashgate for the Hakluyt Society, 2006).

Notes

References
 Forbes, Andrew, and Henley, David, Ancient Chiang Mai Volume 1 (two chapters on Schomburgk in Thailand). Chiang Mai, Cognoscenti Books, 2012.
Peter Rivière (ed.), The Guiana Travels of Robert Schomburgk 1835–1844, 2 vols (Aldershot: Ashgate for the Hakluyt Society, 2006).
Otto A. Schomburgk (ed.), Robert Hermann Schomburgk’s Travels in Guiana and on the Orinoco During the Years 1835–1839 (Georgetown: The Argosy Company, 1931).
Robert Schomburgk, A Description of British Guiana, Geographical and Statistical (London, 1840).
Walter E. Roth (ed. and trans.), Richard Schomburgk’s Travels in British Guiana 1840–1844, 2 vols (Georgetown: Daily Chronicle Office, 1922, 1923).
Gibney, Eleanor.About Robert H. Schomburgk…The Artist Responsible for our Cover Image, St. John Historical Society. Retrieved 26 February 2013.

Attribution

External links
Biographical information. "Robert Schomburgk and the Flower of the Empire" Royal Geographical Society of South Australia.
Review. Works issued by the Hakluyt Society; 3rd series, no. 17) Royal Geographical Society of South Australia.
Review. Twelve views in the interior of Guiana / from drawings executed by Mr. Charles Bentley, after sketches taken during the expedition carried on in the years 1835 to 1839, under the direction of the Royal Geographical Society of London, and aided by Her Majesty's government ; with descriptive letter-press, by Robert H. Schomburgk. London : Ackermann and Co., 1841 Royal Geographical Society of South Australia.
Review. Journal of an expedition from Pirara to the upper Corentyne, and from thence to Demerara : executed by order of Her Majesty’s Government, and under the command of Mr. Robert H. Schomburgk. London : Printed by John Murray, 1845 Royal Geographical Society of South Australia
Sketch Map of British Guiana by Robert Schomburgk

'

1804 births
1865 deaths
People from Freyburg, Germany
German expatriates in the United Kingdom
German expatriates in the United States
Ambassadors of the United Kingdom to Thailand
Ambassadors of the United Kingdom to the Dominican Republic
British explorers
British Guiana people
History of the Colony of Barbados
19th-century British botanists
19th-century German botanists
Fellows of the Royal Society